Eric Kronberg (born June 7, 1983) is an American former professional soccer player who played as a goalkeeper.

Career
Kronberg was drafted in the fourth round (40th overall) of the 2006 MLS Superdraft by the Kansas City Wizards. Kronberg made his MLS debut in a 4–1 win against the San Jose Earthquakes on October 23, 2010. He continued as a backup with the renamed Sporting Kansas City franchise through 2013. In 2014, following the retirement of Jimmy Nielsen, Kronberg was finally given the starting nod for Sporting Kansas City. However, a broken finger in July 2014 essentially ended Kronberg's season.

Kansas City declined the 2015 contract option for Kronberg and in December 2014 he entered the 2014 MLS Re-Entry Draft. He was chosen by Montreal Impact with the first selection in the re-entry draft. He was out-of-contract following the 2017 season.

References

1983 births
Living people
American soccer players
American expatriate soccer players
Association football goalkeepers
California Golden Bears men's soccer players
Expatriate soccer players in Canada
FC Montreal players
Fresno State Bulldogs men's soccer players
Major League Soccer players
Miami FC (2006) players
CF Montréal players
Soccer players from California
Sonoma County Sol players
Sporting Kansas City draft picks
Sporting Kansas City players
Sportspeople from Santa Rosa, California
USL Championship players
USL First Division players
Portland Timbers 2 coaches
Portland Pilots men's soccer coaches
Sacramento Republic FC coaches